Võ Thị Kim Phụng (born 8 June 1993) is a Vietnamese chess player. She won the Asian Junior Girls Championship in 2010 and 2013. Võ also won gold medals at the ASEAN Age-Group Championships in the Girls U-12 category in 2004, the Girls U-14 in 2006 and 2007, the Girls U-16 in 2009, and the Girls U-20 in 2011, 2012 and 2013.

In March 2017, she won the Women's Zonal 3.3 Championship to qualify to play in the Women's World Chess Championship. In May, Võ won the Asian Women's Championship in Chengdu, China. As a result of this victory, she was awarded the title Woman Grandmaster (WGM) by FIDE. In 2018, Võ competed in the Women's World Championship in Khanty-Mansiysk, Russia. She was knocked out by Bela Khotenashvili in the first round after losing by a score of ½–1½.

In team events, Võ has played for Vietnam in the Women's World Team Chess Championship and the Women's Chess Olympiad.

References

External links

Võ Thị Kim Phụng team chess record at Olimpbase.org

1993 births
Living people
Chess woman grandmasters
Vietnamese chess players
Chess Olympiad competitors
People from Huế
Competitors at the 2021 Southeast Asian Games
Southeast Asian Games competitors for Vietnam